Mesophyllum is a genus of red alga belonging to the family Hapalidiaceae.

Species

Bibliography
Lemoine, M. (1928). Un nouveau genre de Mélobésiées: Mesophyllum. Bulletin de la Société Botanique de France 75: 251–254.
Hamel, G. & Lemoine, P. (1953). Corallinacées de France et d'Afrique du Nord. Archs Mus. nat. Hist. nat. Paris VII Ser. 7, 1: 15–136.
Patterson, D. (2001). Platypus checklist of Protoctista.

References

Corallinales
Red algae genera